Benjamin Marsden (5 May 1898 – 1971) was an English footballer who played as a right-back for Port Vale, Queens Park Rangers, and Reading.

Career
Marsden made his first team debut for Port Vale at right-back in a 1–1 draw with Bury at Gigg Lane in a wartime league match on 7 September 1918. He was released at the end of the 1919–20 season after playing a total of six wartime league games for the club. He later played for Queens Park Rangers and Reading.

Career statistics
Source:

References

1898 births
1971 deaths
Sportspeople from Hanley, Staffordshire
English footballers
Association football fullbacks
Port Vale F.C. players
Queens Park Rangers F.C. players
Reading F.C. players
English Football League players